Acacia anarthros is a shrub of the genus Acacia and the subgenus Pulchellae that is endemic to an area of south western Australia.

Description
It blooms from June to September and produces yellow flowers. The simple inflorescences occur singly in the axils and have spherical flower-heads that contain 14 to 16 golden coloured flowers.

Taxonomy
The species was first formally described by the botanist Bruce Maslin in 1979 as a part of the work Studies in the genus Acacia (Mimosaceae) - 9 Additional notes on the Series Pulchellae Benth. as published in the journal Nuytsia. It was reclassified by Leslie Pedley in 2003 as Racosperma anarthon then transferred back to genus Acacia in 2006. The only other synonym is Acacia drewiana subsp. pungens.

Distribution
It is native to a small area in the Wheatbelt region of Western Australia where it is commonly situated on hillslopes growing in gravelly lateritic soils. The limited range is around New Norcia as a part of heathland or open Eucalyptus wandoo woodland or Corymbia calophylla woodland communities.

See also
List of Acacia species

References

anarthros
Acacias of Western Australia
Plants described in 1979
Taxa named by Bruce Maslin